Phonological Knowledge: Conceptual and Empirical Issues is a 2000 book edited by Noel Burton-Roberts, Philip Carr and Gerard Docherty in which the authors deal with different approaches to describing and explaining the nature of phonological knowledge in the speaker’s grammar.

Reception
The book was reviewed by Ricardo Bermúdez-Otero, Michael B. Maxwell and Yen-Hwei Lin.

Essays
 Introduction, Noel Burton-Roberts, Philip Carr, and Gerard Docherty
 The Ontology of Phonology, Sylvain Bromberger and Morris Halle
 Where and What is Phonology? A representational perspective, Noel Burton-Roberts
 Scientific Realism, Sociophonetic Variation, and Innate Endowments in Phonology, Philip Carr
 Speaker, Speech, and Knowledge of Sounds, Gerard Docherty and Paul Foulkes
 Phonology and Phonetics in Psycholinguistic Models of Speech Perception, Jennifer Fitzpatrick and Linda Wheeldon
 Phonology as Cognition, Mark Hale and Charles Reiss
 Vowel Patterns in Mind and Sound, John Harris and Geoff Lindsey
 Boundary Disputes: The distinction between phonetic and phonological sound patterns, Scott Myers
 Conceptual Foundations of Phonology as a Laboratory Science, Janet Pierrehumbert, Mary Beckman, Bob Ladd
 Modularity and Modality in Phonology, Harry van der Hulst
 Phonetics and the Origin of Phonology, Marilyn Vihman and Shelley Velleman

References

External links 
 Phonological Knowledge: Conceptual and Empirical Issues

Edited volumes
Phonology books
Oxford University Press books
2000 non-fiction books
Books about philosophy of linguistics